Tekheyt-e Olya (also Romanized as Tekheyţ-e ‘Olyā and Tekheyt-e ‘Olyā; also known as Tachayat, Takheyt, Tekheyţ-e Bālā, Tokhīţ, Tūkhīt, Tūkhīţ-e ‘Olyā, and Tūkhīţ-e Soflá) is a village in Jarahi Rural District, in the Central District of Mahshahr County, Khuzestan Province, Iran. At the 2006 census, its population was 32, in 7 families.

References 

Populated places in Mahshahr County